Dompoase Senior High School (also known as DOSS) is a mixed second cycle institution in Dompoase in the Adansi North District in the Ashanti Region of Ghana.

History 
The school was established in 1974. In 2014, the headmaster of the school was Mr. Opoku Asamoah. In 2016, the headmistress of the school was Ms. Doris Bimpong. Eric Kwaku Kusi was a former physics teacher at the school and in 2018, Mr. Haruna Oppong was the headmaster of the school. Anglogold Ashanti provided books to the school, Akrofuom SHS, Asare Bediako SHS and others.

Notable alumni 

 Naf Kassi

References 

1974 establishments in Ghana
High schools in Ghana
Public schools in Ghana